Emer Lucey is a Women's Irish Hockey League player. During the early 2010s she was member of the Railway Union team that won three leagues titles. In 2012–13 Lucey was also captain of the Railway Union team that won a national double, winning both the league and the Irish Senior Cup. Lucey has also played senior camogie with Ballyboden St Enda's and Dublin.

GAA family
Lucey's great grandfather, Séamus Gardiner, was President of the GAA from 1943 to 1946. Her father, Peter Lucey, was manager of the Dublin team that won the 2005 All-Ireland Junior Camogie Championship. Her sister, Ciara Lucey has also played senior camogie with Ballyboden St Enda's and Dublin.

Field hockey

Our Lady's, Terenure
Lucey captained the Our Lady's, Terenure team that won the 2005 Leinster Schoolgirls' Premier League. In the final they defeated a High School, Dublin team featuring Nicola Daly and Alison Meeke 2–0.

Railway Union
In 2009–10, together with Cecelia and Isobel Joyce, Kate McKenna and Nicola Evans, Lucey was a member of the Railway Union team that won the Women's Irish Hockey League title. Lucey also played for Railway Union in the 2010 Irish Senior Cup final as they lost to Loreto after a penalty shoot-out. In 2012–13 Lucey was captain of the Railway Union team that won a national double, winning both the Women's Irish Hockey League  and the Irish Senior Cup. In the cup final Lucey scored Railway Union's opening goal as they defeated UCD 3–2. Grace O'Flanagan was also a member of this team. Lucey was also a member of the Railway Union team that finished as league runners up in 2013–14.
Lucey has also represented Railway Union in European club competitions,  including the 2014 EuroHockey Club Champions Cup.

Ireland A
Since 2008, Lucey has been included in Ireland A squads.

Camogie

Clubs
In 2008 Lucey scored the winning goal as Ballyboden St Enda's defeated Rathnure in the Leinster Senior Club Camogie Championship final. Her team mates included her sister, Ciara Lucey, and Rachel Ruddy. Lucey has also won Dublin league and championship titles with Ballyboden.

Inter-county
In 2005 Lucey and her sister, Ciara Lucey, were members of the Dublin team that won the All-Ireland Junior Camogie Championship. She scored Dublin's opening goal as they defeated Clare 2–9 to 1–4. The team was managed by their father, Peter Lucey. Lucey also played for the Dublin senior camogie team.

Teacher
Lucey has worked as a primary school teacher at St. Mary's N.S. in Sandyford.

Honours

Field hockey
Railway Union
Women's Irish Hockey League
Winners: 2009–10, 2011–12, 2012–13 
Runners Up: 2013–14
Irish Senior Cup
Winners:  2012–13
Runners Up: 2009–10

Camogie
Dublin
All-Ireland Junior Camogie Championship
Winners:  2005
Ballyboden St Enda's
Leinster Senior Club Camogie Championship
Winners: 2008
Dublin Senior Club Camogie Championships
Winners: 2006, 2008, 2010, 2011, 2012, 2013 
Senior A Dublin Camogie League
Winners: 2009, 2010

References

1988 births
Living people
Ballyboden St Enda's camogie players
Dublin camogie players
Field hockey players from County Dublin
Irish female field hockey players
Irish schoolteachers
Railway Union field hockey players
Women's Irish Hockey League players